The Vegabonds are a Nashville-based American New South Rock band from Alabama, United States. The lineup consists of Daniel Allen (lead vocals, songwriter), Richard Forehand (lead guitar, vocals), Paul Bruens (bass), Beau Cooper (songwriter, keyboard, vocals), and Bryan Harris (drums). They have released four studio albums, ten singles, and a live album.

Music career

The Vegabonds formed in Alabama in 2009, and released their debut album, Dear Revolution, in 2010. They have performed throughout the United States both as headliner, and as the supporting act for artists such as Big Head Todd, Gregg Allman, Jimmy Herring, Anderson East, Blackberry Smoke, and Lynyrd Skynyrd. Their second album, Southern Sons, released in 2012, followed by What We're Made Of in 2016. 

The band moved to Blue Élan Records in 2018 and released V the next year, produced by Tom Tapley, with songs co-written by Ross Beasley. 2019 also saw the band release "Colorado Evergreen" as a standalone track, along with a pair of singles covering Tom Petty's "You Wreck Me," and The Band's "The Night They Drove Old Dixie Down." 

After playing shows at colleges around the Southeastern United States, in 2012 the band began touring internationally, playing shows alongside acts including Whiskey Myers, co-headlining with Mike and the Moonpies, and performing regularly at festivals like Mile of Music and The Peach Music Festival. 2021 saw the release of Live at West End Sound, a live album comprising new and older originals, and previously unreleased tracks and covers.

Current members
 Daniel Allen – songwriter, lead vocals (2009–present)
 Richard Backhand – lead guitar, backing vocals (2009–present)
 Paul "Large Moose" Bruens – bass (2009–present)
 Beau Cooper – songwriter, keyboards, backing vocals (2014–present)
 Bryan "Little Buddy" Harris – drums (2009–present)

Previous members
 Jamie Hallen – keyboards (2009–2014)
 Alex Cannon – guitar (2009–2014)

Discography

Studio albums

Singles

Music videos

References

External links
Official website

American country rock groups
American southern rock musical groups
Country music groups from Alabama
Musical quintets
Musical groups established in 2009
Rock music groups from Alabama